John Hubert Christian Corlette (1911-1977) was an English architect  and the founder of Aiglon College in Switzerland. Prior to founding Aiglon, Corlette was a teacher at Gordonstoun, a private school in Scotland, and he included some of that school's educational ideas in the formation of Aiglon.

Early years
Corlette, born John Hubert Christian Corlette on 21 June 1911, 
was the son of Australian architect Major Hubert Christian Corlette OBE and his wife, Florence Gwynedd Davies-Berrington.

As a teenager, Corlette attended Stowe School, in Buckinghamshire, England. Because of ill health, he was advised to find a healthier environment, and it was recommended that he attend a school in Switzerland where the high altitude and drier air might assist his recovery; this is how he came to go to school in the alpine village of Chesières, Villars-sur-Ollon.

University life and early employment
Corlette studied Philosophy, Politics, Economics and History at Exeter College, then left to practice architecture, he then returned to complete his degree in 1943. Finding that he had an interest in education, he taught at the College at South Leigh and Gordonstoun which he left due to a disagreement with its founder Kurt Hahn.

Founding of Aiglon College
In 1949 Corlette opened his school in Chesières, the same village where he had gone to school as a teenager.

Like his mentor Kurt Hahn, Corlette wrote no books to guide future generations in the creation of a curriculum.  His speeches, like those of Hahn's, guide the reader away from a focus on curriculum and textbooks and toward the use of philosophy and environment to improve "the whole man.”

The following extracts from a speech given by Corlette at Aiglon's end-of-term ceremony in July 1973 help illustrate his vision for the school. At the time of delivering this address, the school had expanded to nearly 300 students and had introduced co-education. However, the precepts that guided the early years of the school were still present 25 years after its foundation in 1949.

 Education should be more than academics. We believe that the goal of education is, or should be, the development of the spiritual man, that is of that part of each one of us which, with development and training, is capable of a vision or direct apprehension of the purpose of life, of the true nature of ourselves, of the world in which we live and of such other worlds or states of being as may exist besides.
 Standards of behaviour should be set by the school.
 Another of our basic principles is that we believe that it is the business of those who direct the school, first to set the standards which they believe the students should be aiming at, and state them in no equivocal fashion, and secondly that they should provide a method of grading for each aspect which will enable the student to know what progress the school authorities think he is making.  This grading should, if necessary and where possible, be accompanied by explanations which will help the student to understand his assessment and plan his future progress.
 In other words, “tolerance of the beliefs of others” does not mean that there is a relativistic “any standards will do” approach to teaching.  Multiculturalism does not connote a lack of universal standards.
 Education requires teachers to look beyond academics, even if the judgments might be regarded as “subjective.”   This is no reason for teachers to avoid the responsibility of judging their pupils' work and progress, moreover this is precisely how promotion is accorded to us in real life outside school.
 A rank system or similar structure that rewards good behaviour is central to the school’s method. It charts the course of the development of the boy or girl as regards his character, sense of responsibility, maturity and general development in relation to the basic standards of conduct and morality which we lay down and which are derived, as far as we are able to understand them, from the  teachings of Jesus Christ and other great teachers.  This assessment has come to be known here as the Rank System, and is absolutely basic to the idea of education at Aiglon. Note: Corlette did not like the word “rank” as it held unintended military overtones.
 A system of rewarding merit outside the classroom is needed.
 We get promoted in our business or occupation and our salary increased precisely as we are able to convince our superiors in the hierarchy of our merits with reference to their requirements.  The exception to this is of course if we are members of a trade union, in which case, as things are today, our salaries are increased, not according to our merit, but according to the seriousness of the threats with which we are able to menace our employers. There have been attempts by students in some schools to follow this example by threatening the school authorities in various ways if they do not give them what they want.  This could not happen at Aiglon for the very simple reason that we would rather close the school than abandon our principles.
 Education includes developing appreciation for and a relationship with our environment. Intimate contact with nature, too, is important, and a realization of our living relationship with it. Hence our adventure training program.
 Learning to live with others and maintaining good relations with people is part of an education. Absolutely essential too is a positive and loving relationship with all other people regardless of their origin, background or beliefs, and a positive and loving relationship with everything in the world and in the universe around us.
 The education which we offer is designed to go far beyond [passing your exams or getting a better job.  It aims] to develop the whole of you and not just a part, to help you to become truly and intensely alive, to help you to a knowledge of and understanding of that part of you which I call the spiritual part, by attention whose dictates you can attain to much more than success in examinations and a good job, that is to lasting happiness. Note: This theory of education goes further than a typical school’s mission.

Links to Round Square
The beginnings of Round Square:

Corlette met and became friends with Dr. Kurt Hahn of the Round Square organisation. Hahn maintained that it was crucial for students to prepare for life by having them confront it, to develop courage, generosity, imagination, principle and resolution. He felt that this would result in young people becoming better equipped, developing the skills and abilities to become the leaders and guardians of the future.

Aiglon College became a member school of the Round Square association in 19xx, and followed these same precepts, giving the school an additional respect and regard in the educational community.

The Round Square web site notes that, "Unlike all the other twentieth century educational innovators, Hahn wrote no books. His testimony and legacy rest in his schools and other programmes he initiated."  Like Kurt Hahn, John Corlette left behind a school that he had started.

A tribute to Corlette: "John Corlette of Aiglon...was our most powerful personality and he was the only one to own his own school. He was urging expansion and development long before I felt we were ready for it. He insisted that there must be an association journal but it was not until 1982 that the enthusiasm and driving energy of Margaret Sittler got “Echo” going. John was an original and this showed itself in his creation Aiglon and its most characteristic custom: the morning Meditation. He collected art and had a weakness for Jaguars (petrol driven). He was a master of publicity and used this much to the benefit of his school. During the first American conference at Athenian in 1972, Aiglon gave a reception in San Francisco and a very fine film of the school was shown with a commentary by the best of the BBC announcers. It began with the camera swinging through the arc of mountains between Aiguille Verte and the Dent du Midi. Then it swept down into the Rhone valley and one saw the distant road zigzagging up towards Villars. A small object driving up the road grew into a familiar streamline shape and the voice of the BBC chimed in: “John Corlette had a dream”. There was a chortle of joy from the assembled Heads, which John took in good part."

The above is an extract from The Muscles of Friendship – a valedictory speech by Jocelin Winthrop Young, Founding Director of Round Square, on the occasion of his retirement, October 1992 (made at Bishop's College School, Lennoxville, Quebec, Canada).

References

1911 births
1977 deaths
Architects from Buckinghamshire
20th-century English architects
Alumni of Exeter College, Oxford
British expatriates in Switzerland
People educated at Stowe School